Newhall is a new housing estate within Harlow, Essex, England. In 2009, it was being built on land originally forming part of Soper Farm. A landowner led development, its planners are Roger Evans Associates, an architectural practice based in Oxford. The design of the new neighbourhood is different from the rest of the first generation New Town, featuring striking contemporary architecture. The plan for Newhall precedes government set housing density levels, current sustainability standards and introduced design codes at a time when they were not common.

Influenced by the design principles implemented by Harlow’s masterplanner, Sir Frederick Gibberd. Newhall will eventually be another neighbourhood within Harlow with community facilities – a primary school, doctor’s surgery and retail units at it heart, serving some 6,000 residents. Extensive cycle tracks and an easily negotiated street pattern should encourage residents out of their cars to access the neighbourhood amenities. All homes will be no further than 65 yards from a ‘green space’; some 40 per cent of the entire area has been set aside for parks and a wildlife reserve.

To maintain the overall coherence of the scheme, the landowners and planners have retained the right to sign off the design of individual schemes as they come forward for planning approval. Although design codes exist, architects are still able to exert a lot of freedom of expression and it this that sets Newhall apart from many other new housing schemes.

By 2009, the first phase of 500 homes had been largely completed. The second phase of 2,300 was due to get underway shortly afterwards.

References

External links
 Newhall Project

Housing estates in England
Areas of Harlow